Mukhammetkalyy Duyshekeyevich Abylgaziyev (born 20 January 1968) is a Kyrgyz politician. He was the First Deputy Prime Minister of Kyrgyzstan from April 2016 to August 2017, Acting Prime Minister of Kyrgyzstan from 22 August to 26 August 2017, and Prime Minister of Kyrgyzstan from April 2018 until his resignation in June 2020, during a criminal investigation into his government's sale of radio frequencies.

Early life and education
Abylgaziyev was born on 20 January 1968 in the Kochkor District of the Naryn Oblast in the Kyrgyz SSR. In 1994 he graduated from the Agricultural Institute named after Constantin Scriabine with a specialization in Agronomy. In 1997 he graduated from the Faculty of Economics and Business at the International University of Kyrgyzstan.

Prime Minister of Kyrgyzstan

Abylgaziyev was the acting Prime Minister of Kyrgyzstan from 22 August to 26 August 2017. He was appointed following Sooronbay Jeenbekov's resignation to contest the October 2017 presidential election. Abulgaziyev previously served as Deputy Prime Minister. On April 20, 2018, he was reappointed Prime Minister by President Sooronbay Jeenbekov, after Prime Minister Sapar Isakov's government was sacked. On April 25, the new government was sworn in.

During his term, Abylgaziyev met frequently with other heads of government, including with Kazakh Prime Minister Bakhytzhan Sagintayev, Russian Prime Minister Dmitry Medvedev, Pakistani Prime Minister Imran Khan, Armenian Prime Minister Nikol Pashinyan, Chinese Premier Li Keqiang and Turkish President Recep Tayyip Erdoğan.

On 15 June 2020, Abylgaziev resigned from his post as Prime Minister in connection with criminal allegations against the government on the extension and renewal of radio frequency resources, though Abylgaziyev denied any wrongdoing.

Cabinet
As at 25 April 2018:

Kubatbek Boronov
Jenish Razakov
Altynai Omurbekov
Zamirbek Askarov
Minister of Agriculture, Food Industry and Melioration – Nurbek Murashev
Minister of Culture, Information and Tourism – Sultanbek Jumagulov
Minister of the Economy – Oleg Pankratov
Minister of Education and Science – Gulmira Kudayberdieva
Minister of Emergency Situations – Nurbolot Mirzakhmedov  
Minister of Finance – Adylbek Kasymaliev
Minister of Foreign Affairs – Erlan Abdyldayev
Minister of Health Care – Kosmosbek Cholponbaev
Minister of Internal Affairs – Kashkar Dzhunushaliev
Minister of Justice – Ainur Abdyldaeva
Minister of Labor and Social Development – Taalaikul Isakunova
Minister of Transport and Roads – Zhamshitbek Kalilov
Chairman of the State Committee for National Security – Idris Kadyrkulov
Chairman of the State Committee for Defense Affairs – Erlis Terdikbayev
Chairman of the State Committee for Industry, Energy and Subsoil Use – Ulanbek Ryskulov
Chairman of the State Committee of Information Technologies and Communications – Bakyt Sharshembiev

References

1968 births
Living people
People from Naryn Region
Prime Ministers of Kyrgyzstan